Holiday is the twenty-first studio and the first Christmas album by the American band Earth, Wind & Fire, released in October 2014 by Sony/Legacy. The album reached No. 26 on the Billboard Top R&B/Hip Hop Albums and No. 8 on the Billboard Holiday Albums charts.

Overview
According to longtime band member Verdine White, "We never thought about doing a holiday album before, but Legacy/Sony asked and so have our fans, so we hope the audience likes it."

Along with a number of traditional Christmas songs, Holiday includes two Earth, Wind & Fire songs that were reworked just for this release:
 "Happy Seasons" (originally Happy Feelin''' from That's the Way of the World, 1975)
 "December" (originally September from The Best of Earth, Wind & Fire, Vol. 1'', 1978)

Critical reception

Randy Lewis of the Los Angeles Times gave the album a 3 out of five stars rating and wrote "The venerable R&B band does what it does best here: lays on the hard and heavy funk with fat horn accents and thick rhythmic riffs to propel a batch of time-tested holiday favorites."
With an 8 out of 10 rating Matt Bauer of Exclaim! stated "Holiday is here, and it's anything but the uninspired, calculated cash grab that's become all too synonymous with yuletide offerings."
Sarah Rodman of The Boston Globe found that "on its first seasonal outing, the legendary R&B outfit brings the joy on a horn-flecked collection of familiar tunes".
Simon Redley of Blues & Soul gave a 6 out of 10 rating saying "I usually keep as far away from Christmas albums as turkey or geese should from a kitchen, during the last few weeks of the year! Schmaltzy old chestnuts re-done for the zillionth time, often about as sincere as an MP on your doorstep a few days before an election. So when asked to review this one, I emitted a loud sigh and prepared for an hour or so of tedium. But I actually enjoyed most of this album, and there are some real high spots. The treatment the songs were given means these sound nothing like we have heard them before too." 
Brett Milano of OffBeat also proclaimed "If you need to funkify your holiday mix (and you’ve already got the Christmas EP that George Porter Jr. released in ’12), this will do fine." With a B− grade Melissa Ruggieri of the Atlanta Journal-Constitution noted "From the opening notes of "Joy to the World," it's apparent that EWF's first-ever holiday album isn't going to stray too far from the legendary R&B-funk band's signature sound with blasts of brass and calls to keep clapping." Daryl Easlea of Record Collector gave a 3 out of 5 stars rating describing the album as "Relentlessly upbeat, beautifully played and staying clear of too many sleigh bell-type clichés, it will provide a perennial alternative to more traditional fare."

Track listing

References

2014 Christmas albums
Albums produced by Philip Bailey
Earth, Wind & Fire albums
Christmas albums by American artists